The Kursaal Congress Centre and Auditorium is a complex comprising several spaces: a great auditorium, many-use halls and exhibition halls. It was designed by Spanish architect Rafael Moneo, and is located in Donostia-San Sebastián (Basque Country, Spain). It opened in 1999.

It consists of several spaces, including the 1,800-seat concert hall, the Palacio de Congresos-Auditorio Kursaal, and is the home of the biggest film festival in Spain, the San Sebastian International Film Festival, in existence since 1953.

History

Placement: K Plot

The Great Kursaal was an elegant palace built in 1921, incorporating a casino, a restaurant, a cinema theater, complementary rooms and an 859-seat theater, placed in front of the Gros beach, and next to the mouth of the Urumea river. Part of the interior, including the main hall, was designed by Victor Eusa. The entire building was pulled down in 1973. An empty plot (later called K Plot) was freed. The absence of any architectonic structure in such a privileged site for so many years was remarkable.

Discarded projects
At the time the old palace was pulled down, a competition was held to find a replacement. However, the winning project was never constructed due to its complexity.

A new project proposal was submitted in 1972. After a few changes to the design, building work was started in 1975, but after the perimeter wall was complete and the foundations in place, works was halted. The plot of land then passed from private hands (as the Great Kursaal had been private) to public hands, so a public consortium was created for the purposes of constructing a new building.

Final choice
Once the 1972 project discarded, and facing the possibility of building a great auditorium in the K Plot, six architects were consulted in 1989: Mario Botta, Norman Foster, Arata Isozaki, Rafael Moneo, Juan Navarro Baldeweg and Luis Peña Ganchegui. Of the six projects, the one of Moneo was chosen (the motto of which was "Two beached rocks").

Beginning and ending of the works
After the project was written down between 1991 and 1994, the works were begun in 1996, and were not finished until 1999. During this period some funding problems arose, mainly because of the refusal of the Basque Government (who paid for a 16% of the total cost) to increase the funds. After these problems were solved, the works were concluded in 1999. The Kursaal Congress Centre was designed by Rafael Moneo and awarded the European Union Prize for Contemporary Architecture in 2001.

The initial impact of the buildings upon the Donostian landscape (characterized as it was by early twentieth century French-style architecture) was deemed negative by Donostians: the simplistic, cubic structure clashed with the baroque elegance of the existing sandstone buildings. The significance of the building (opened August 23, 1999, with a concert of the Euskadi Simphonic Orchestra and Ainhoa Arteta) was also eclipsed by the parallel construction of the Guggenheim museum in Bilbao, which was twice as expensive as the Kursaal. However, after an adaptation period, most citizens came to tolerate the inappropriate style of the Kursaal building, and support the positive role which it plays in the economy, tourism and cultural life of Donostia.

The building

It is mainly constituted as two large prismatic volumes, that emerge from a platform. Each "cube" (as they are known), is formed by an inner prismatic structure, surrounded by double translucent glass panels, which are supported by a metallic structure. Between the cubes there is a large terrace, commanding views which take in the Zurriola Beach and the mouth of the Urumea river. This terrace is host to many events, including many of the concerts which go to make up the Donostia Jazz Festival ("Jazzaldia")

Kursaal Auditorium
Placed inside the biggest cube (and closest to the sea), this auditorium can hold an audience of 1,806, and is the most frequently used one for big events. The first seat rows can be removed to make room for the orchestra in an opera.

Chamber Hall
This seats 600 people, and is placed in the small cube. It is used for congresses or smaller concerts.

Multiple-use rooms
These are used for a variety of events for more limited audiences.

Exhibition halls
The halls are used for housing galleries and other exhibitions.

Kubo Hall
It is an exhibition hall under the supervision of the Kutxa savings bank.

Moreover, the building has a restaurant owned by Martín Berasategui, various shops in its basement, and a car park.

External links 

 Official website

Buildings and structures in Gipuzkoa
Concert halls in Spain
Convention centers in Spain
San Sebastián
Tourist attractions in the Basque Country (autonomous community)
Buildings and structures completed in 1999
Cultural infrastructure completed in 1999
1999 establishments in Spain
Rafael Moneo buildings
Modernist architecture in Spain
Trade fair venues in Spain